StrataFlash is a NOR flash memory technology first developed by Intel.

It stores two or more bits of information per cell rather than just one, in an architecture called multi-level cell (MLC). This is accomplished by storing intermediate voltage levels instead of using only the two levels (discharged = "0" and charged = "1") of traditional binary memories. The StrataFlash technology evolved out of Intel's ETOX flash memory products. Two bits per cell are achieved with four levels of voltage, while three bits per cell can be achieved with eight levels.

Research of this technology began in 1992 and the first commercial products were released in 1997.
Further developments allowed faster read speeds by offering synchronous burst mode and asynchronous page mode read operations.

References

Computer memory
Non-volatile memory
Solid-state computer storage media